Professor Cynthia Pine CBE (born October 1953) is a British Dentistry educator. In 2003, she became the first woman to lead a British school of dentistry. She is the first woman appointed to head a dentistry school in the UK.

She is one of a group of highly successful Guyanese people in Britain (Michael White of The Guardian refers to them as the "Guyanese mafia"), which includes Waheed Alli, Raj Persaud, Herman Ouseley and David Dabydeen, Keith Waithe and Rudolph Dunbar.

Life
Pine was born in 1953 in Guyana. She graduated from the University of Manchester with a Bachelor of Dental Surgery (BDS) in 1976 and a PhD from the same institution in 1982, and has an MBA from the University of Dundee.

She was appointed Dean of the University of Liverpool School of Dentistry in 2003. She was later appointed as Pro Vice Chancellor, International at Salford University.

Pine was made a Commander of the Most Excellent Order of the British Empire (CBE) in 2006. She has been included in the Powerlist of the UK's 100 most influential people of African and Afro-Caribbean descent.

Since 2013 Pine has been a professor of Dental Public Health at the Institute of Dentistry, Barts and The London School of Medicine and Dentistry, and Academic Lead and Head of the Unit of Dental Public Health since 2014.

In 2018, Pine was awarded the EW Borrow Memorial Award at the International Association for Dental Research Conference in London, in recognition of her research in oral health prevention for children.

In 2020 a portrait of Pine was included in the exhibition Phenomenal Women: Portraits of UK Black Female Professors.

References

1953 births
Living people
British dentists
Alumni of the University of Dundee
Alumni of the University of Manchester
British university and college faculty deans
Women deans (academic)
British women scientists
Black British women academics
Black British people in health professions
Commanders of the Order of the British Empire